The United Kingdom of Great Britain and Northern Ireland competed as Great Britain at the 1928 Winter Olympics in St. Moritz, Switzerland. These games marked the first time in Olympic History that Great Britain didn't take a gold medal.

Medallists

Bobsleigh

Figure skating

Men

Women

Pairs

Ice hockey

Group A
The top team (highlighted) advanced to the medal round.

Medal round
The top teams from each of the three groups, plus Canada, which had received a bye into the medal round, played a 3-game round-robin to determine the medal winners.

Skeleton

Speed skating

Men

References

 Olympic Winter Games 1928, full results by sports-reference.com

Nations at the 1928 Winter Olympics
1928
Olympics, Winter
Winter sports in the United Kingdom